Lathi is a town with municipality in Amreli district in the Indian state of Gujarat.

Geography
It has an average elevation of 141 metres (462 feet).

Demographics
 India census, Lathi had a population of 20,964. Males constitute 51% of the population and females 49%. Lathi has an average literacy rate of 63%, higher than the national average of 59.5%: male literacy is 71%, and female literacy is 55%. In Lathi, 15% of the population is under 6 years of age.

References

Cities and towns in Amreli district
Gohils